This supranational electoral calendar for the year 2016 lists the supranational elections held in 2016.

April
10 April: Andean Parliament, Election of the Peruvian representatives

May
15 May: Central American Parliament (Parlacen), Election of the Dominican deputies to the Parlacen

June
13 June: United Nations General Assembly, President
28 June: United Nations Security Council, Security Council

July
21 July–5 October: United Nations, United Nations Secretary-General

November
6 November: Central American Parliament (Parlacen), Election of the Nicaraguan deputies to the Parlacen

References

2016 elections
Supranational elections